Orgizocella is a genus of horse flies in the family Tabanidae.

Distribution
Madagascar.

Species
Orgizocella pauliana Quentin, 1990
Orgizocella seyrigi (Séguy, 1951)

References

Brachycera genera
Tabanidae
Diptera of Africa